The fissi (Sarotherodon caroli) is a species of cichlid endemic to Lake Barombi Mbo in western Cameroon.  This species can reach a length of  SL. It is threatened because of pollution and sedimentation due to human activities. It is potentially also threatened by large emissions of carbon dioxide (CO2) from the lake's bottom (compare Lake Nyos), although studies indicate that Barombo Mbo lacks excess amounts of this gas.

Adults mainly feed on phytoplankton.

References

Endemic fauna of Cameroon
Sarotherodon
Cichlid fish of Africa
Fish of Lake Barombi Mbo
Fish described in 1930
Taxonomy articles created by Polbot